Absolute Zero is an album by American singer-songwriter and pianist Bruce Hornsby, released on April 12, 2019 by Zappo Productions. This is Hornsby's sixth solo studio album credited only to his name, the first since Halcyon Days in 2004, and his thirteenth overall album. It features a wide array of guest musicians, including Justin Vernon of Bon Iver, jazz drummer Jack DeJohnette, and the ensemble yMusic. It also features a lyrical contribution from Grateful Dead lyricist Robert Hunter on the closing track, "Take You There (Misty)".

Composition and lyrics 

Hornsby cited a plethora of literary and musical inspiration for the music and lyrics of Absolute Zero. When discussing the album in an interview with the Guardian, he said, "There are some minimalist composers that influenced me on this record – Steve Reich, Philip Glass, John Adams – and that tends to be a less chromatic, dissonant area of music." He also cited passages written by authors Don DeLillo and David Foster Wallace as inspiration for the lyrics of the title track and "White Noise", respectively.
In an interview with Stereogum, Hornsby said that most of the tracks on Absolute Zero had stemmed from film scoring projects for Spike Lee. "I've been scoring movies for [Lee] and his Netflix series She's Gotta Have It. I've written about 230-plus pieces of music for these many projects. These pieces can range from one minute long to four or five minutes long, and through the years I would always earmark certain cues as being special in the sense that they sounded like they wanted to become songs."

Critical reception 

The album received largely positive reviews. Writing for Pitchfork, Stephen Thomas Erlewine awarded the album a score of 7.4 out of 10, writing: "Hornsby writes with elegance, at ease with both his traces of hipness and essential squareness." Jason Heller, writing for NPR was even more complimentary, writing: "Far from a conventional Hornsby album, Absolute Zero is the sound of an artist subverting expectations and pulling it off brilliantly. At this point in his career, Hornsby could easily coast on writing cozy songs and settling for that. Thankfully for us, he's still up for an adventure." The album was also awarded a score of 80% by AllMusic, and a score of 82% by Metacritic.

Track listing

References 

2019 albums
Bruce Hornsby albums